Sutherland Oval is a sporting ground, situated in Sutherland, New South Wales. It has been used for professional Rugby League matches, as well as for lower tiered Soccer and Rugby Union matches over the years.

Ground Usage
In the late 1950s, the Sutherland Sharks FC football (soccer) club played at the ground, before moving to Seymour Shaw Park, in the NSW Premier League competition.

In the NSWRL competition, the Cronulla Sutherland Sharks club used this ground as their home ground. The club entered the national competition in 1967, and held their first two seasons at this venue (in 1967 and 1968), before moving to Endeavour Field, where they have stayed ever since the move in 1969.

In 2008, the Southern Sharks played at this ground, playing in the Jim Beam Cup, a lower tiered rugby league competition.

Sutherland Loftus United currently play here, in the Cronulla-Sutherland District Rugby Football League.

See also

Rugby league in New South Wales

References

External links

Sports venues in Sydney
Rugby league stadiums in Australia